Cláudia Maria Pastor (born 15 July 1971) is a Brazilian former basketball player who competed in the 1996 Summer Olympics.

References

1971 births
Living people
Brazilian women's basketball players
Olympic basketball players of Brazil
Basketball players at the 1996 Summer Olympics
Olympic silver medalists for Brazil
Olympic medalists in basketball
Medalists at the 1996 Summer Olympics